102 Not Out is a 2018 Indian Hindi-language comedy drama film directed by Umesh Shukla and written by Saumya Joshi. The film has the two legends Amitabh Bachchan and Rishi Kapoor in lead roles who play father-son duo for the first time. It also stars Jimit Trivedi in a supporting role. The story revolves around Dattatraya Vakharia (Bachchan), a 102-year-old jovial person who tries to reform his 75-year-old unenthusiastic son Babulal Vakharia (Kapoor).

Plot 

Babulal Vakharia (Rishi Kapoor) is a 75-year-old unenthusiastic widower who believes that he is too aged and fragile to enjoy life. His 102-year-old father Dattatraya Vakharia (Amitabh Bachchan) is his stark opposite who enjoys life in his jovial ways as his mental age is just 26. Dhirubhai Srivastava (Jimit Trivedi), also known as Dhiru, is an employee working at the nearby medical store who delivers medicines to the Vakharias. Dhiru likes Dattatraya due to his lively attitude but is scared of Babulal due to his grumpy nature. Meanwhile, Dattatraya aims to break the record of a longest-living Chinese person on Earth, who lived up till 118 years of age. He seeks to get rid of all the negative and boring elements surrounding him to accomplish his goal. Hence, he threatens to send his son to an old age home as that will be more convenient for Babulal too. After Babulal protests, Dattatraya allows him to stay at home only if he completes some tasks. 

Firstly, Babulal writes a love letter to his deceased wife Chandrika, in which, he expresses dismay as she had once got into an argument with his deceased mother Saraswati but never with his father. Secondly, he stops visiting his doctor's clinic for a daily checkup, instead of accusing the doctor of theft as per Dattatraya's advice. According to the third task, Dattatraya asks Babulal to cut holes in his childhood blanket which he and Saraswati had bought for him in Kashmir; Babulal instantly rejects his proposal. 

Later, Dhiru takes Babulal to a playground which reminds him of his childhood memories. He is subsequently taken to a church, which reminds Babulal of the memories he had spent with his estranged son Amol Vakharia (Dharmendra Gohil), who lives in the US. He becomes sorrowed and buys a cake from a city bakery, distributing it to young children on the streets. Babulal even completes the third task by cutting holes in the blanket and begins to appreciate his father's outlook on life, much to Dattatraya's delight.

Few months later, things start to take a turn when Amol tries to call up Babulal repeatedly but Dattatraya cleverly disconnects his phone calls, not wanting Amol to communicate with his son. However, Babulal learns about Dattatraya's interruption and calls Amol who informs him that he will be soon visiting India. Dattatraya gives Babulal his last task which is to kick Amol out of their house once he will arrive in India, for all his negligence towards his family. He is aware that Amol's motive of visiting them after several years is to claim their property as their heir. Not wanting to behave rudely with his son, Babulal gets furious at Dattatraya and stops talking to him. 

While trying to convince Babulal, Dattatraya reveals to Dhiru that Babulal had spent all his savings to send Amol abroad for his studies. However, Amol ignored him by telling him nothing about his new life over there, getting married, and settling in the US. He even discloses that after Amol's settlement in America, Chandrika suffered from Alzheimer's disease in her last days and unfortunately, the only thing she remembered till her death was Amol. Babulal still chides Dattatraya for his advices against Amol and begs him not to interfere between them both. Dhiru also supports Babulal for the first time, thinking that Amol should be given a second chance. 

However, Dattatraya reveals to Babulal and Dhiru that few months ago, he underwent a medical checkup and learnt that he has brain tumor and realised that he would not remain for long. This provoked him to cook up the story of his goal and the old age home for Babulal, in order to make Babulal get rid of his grumpy and unenthusiastic approach towards life. Babulal understands Dattatraya's pain and decides to fulfill his last wish for his happiness. 

Eventually, Amol arrives in India and meets Babulal at the airport gate. Over there, Babulal confronts Amol over his pursuit of something apart from his teachings. He even berates him over how his negligence towards the family caused his mother's death. Handing over Amol's childhood savings, Babulal humiliates Amol in public and orders him to leave, delighting Dattatraya and Dhiru. Dattatraya then expresses his last wish before Babulal, that he should whistle loudly the moment he breathes his last. Babulal then takes Dattatraya for an outing from his wheelchair and the two happily dance in the rain. 

One month later, Babulal and Dhiru are shown sitting by the sea in the happy memories of the recently deceased Dattatraya. Over there, Dhiru presents Babulal a recording of Dattatraya who predicts in it that the record of the longest living person will be broken by Babulal himself.

Cast

Main 

 Amitabh Bachchan as Dattatray Vakharia
 Rishi Kapoor as Babulal Vakharia 
 Jimit Trivedi as Dhirubhai Srivastava a.k.a. Dhiru

Supporting 
 
 Dharmendra Gohil as Amol Vakharia  
 Nilesh Pandya as Hasmukh Bhai (Dhiru's employer) 
 Rakhi Mansha as Housemaid at the Vakharias 
 Avadhesh Bhagat as Dr. Chandravardhan Mehta (Babulal's regular doctor) 
 Vooqo as Restaurant Manager (Special Appearance) 
 Ashok Pathak as Auto-Rickshaw Driver (Special Appearance) 
 Vijay Raaz  as Narrator

Soundtrack 

The music of the film has been composed by Salim–Sulaiman, Amitabh Bachchan and Rohan-Vinayak while the lyrics were written by Hiral Brahmbhatt, Saumya Joshi, Amitabh Bhattacharya and Kaifi Azmi. The songs featured in the film are sung by Arijit Singh, Armaan Malik, Sonu Nigam, Amitabh Bachchan, Rishi Kapoor and Hiral Brahmabhatt. George Joseph has composed the background music for this film. The first song of the film, Bachche Ki Jaan which is sung by Singh was released on 10 April 2018. The second song of the film, Badumbaaa which is sung by Bachchan and Kapoor was released on 18 April 2018. The music album was released on 30 April 2018 by Saregama Music. Vipin Nair of The Hindu gave the soundtrack 3.5/5 stating that Salim-Sulaiman delivered "their best work in a very long time".

Makeup 
The make-up for Amitabh Bachchan and Rishi Kapoor is done by makeup and prosthetic artist Preetisheel Singh. Considering the fact that both the actors have to play their characters that are more than their actual age, a lot of prosthetics and makeup were used to make them look like their respective character's age. Bollywood Hungama echoes, "The review would be incomplete without the mention of Preetisheel Singh's makeup, hair and prosthetic. She gives a great look to both the veteran actors which also turns out to be the film's USP."

Box office 
In India, the film earned  nett and  gross. In China, the film grossed  as of 9 December 2018, including  during its opening weekend there. In other territories, the film grossed  as of 3 December 2018. Combined, the film grossed  worldwide as of 9 December 2018.

Critical reception 
Rajeev Masand of News18 gave the film a rating of 3 out of 5 saying that, "Despite its many shortcomings 102 Not Out has its heart in the right place, and a pair of actors clearly enjoying themselves on screen. Their infectious energy alone makes this film worth a watch." Rachit Gupta of The Times of India gave the film a rating of 3.5 out of 5 saying that, "The unique and refreshing concept of 102 Not Out is its strength. It's just a happy and healthy entertainer that tells you that living in the moment and making the most of everyday of your life is all that matters." Shalini Langer of The Indian Express gave the film a rating of 2 out of 5 saying that, "No doubt it's great to see a film about two old people. But we have seen both Amitabh Bachchan and Rishi Kapoor in that avatar in better films (Piku especially, and in Kapoor & Sons) before this." Rohit Vats of Hindustan Times gave the film a rating of 3 out of 5 and said that, "102 Not Outs heart is firmly in the right place. The film knows its territory and the emotions it wants to evoke. It's just that a few important characters don't get enough play and they are sacrificed to make space to Amitabh Bachchan and Rishi Kapoor." Raja Sen of NDTV gave the film a rating of 2 out of 5 saying that, "Shukla's film is a sweet but dull enterprise, one that never quite rises above its ultimate ambition: that of having two legendary actors play off each other."

Rohit Bhatnagar of Deccan Chronicle gave the film a rating of 3.5 out of 5 saying that, "The Amitabh Bachchan and Rishi Kapoor starrer film is a heart warming experience of celebrating life as it comes." Namrata Joshi of The Hindu reviewed the film saying that, "Umesh Shukla's film is unable to leave its inherent theatricality behind. It gets unchanging in terms of the give and take between the duo and leaves the viewers static too. It stirs nothing within, leaving you unmoved." Meena Iyer of DNA India gave the film a rating of 3.5 out of 5 saying that, "This is a small, sweet film with its heart in the right place." Anupama Chopra of Film Companion gave the film a rating of 3 out of 5 saying that, "102 Not Out is uneven but heartfelt. Despite the flaws, the emotions connect." Sonil Dedhia of Mid-Day gave the film a rating of 3 out of 5 saying that, "Bachchan and Kapoor's effortless performances, coupled with their intoxicating screen presence make this movie worth watching."

References

External links 

 
 

2010s Hindi-language films
Indian films based on plays
Indian comedy-drama films
Films directed by Umesh Shukla
2018 comedy-drama films
Sony Pictures films
Columbia Pictures films
Sony Pictures Networks India films